Stephania pierrei, also known as Stephania erecta or binh voi in Vietnamese, is a caudiciform vine native to the Indo-Chinese Peninsula. It is cultivated as a houseplant; in commerce it is typically described as Stephania erecta. It was first described by Ludwig Diels in 1910. The root or caudex is used medicinally in Vietnam; the 2006 Vietnam Red List of Medicinal Plants lists Stephania pierrei as a vulnerable species within the country.

Appearance 
Stephania pierrei is an herbaceous perennial vine with an unusual woody caudiciform, a stem swollen in a spherical form and aesthetically resembling a potato in colour and texture, that can grow up to 30 cm (1 ft) in diameter. It sprouts long vines with small circular leaves with intricate mosaic veining. This unusual appearance has made it a popular collector houseplant.  It sprouts in spring, first with yellow flowers, followed by its foliage. The foliage can go dormant in winter.

References

pierrei
Endemic flora of Thailand
Plants described in 1910
House plants
Caudiciform plants